Pogodno was a district of the city of Szczecin, Poland, that functioned from 1954 to 1976.

History 
Pogodno was established on 7 October 1954, as one of four district of the city of Szczecin, Poland. The other three districts were: Dąbie, Nad Odrą, and Śródmieście. It bordered Nad Odrą to the northeast, and Śródmieście to the southeast. In 1961, it was inhabited by 65 821 people. It existed until 19 November 1976, when the district were abolished.

The city was again divided into districts in 1990. The former area of Pogodno was divided between Zachód, and Śródmieście.

Subdivisions 
The district was subdivided into 8 administrative neighbourhoods.

References 

Districts of Szczecin (1954–1976)
States and territories established in 1954
States and territories disestablished in 1976
1954 establishments in Poland
1976 disestablishments in Poland